Cyprinus chilia is a species of ray-finned fish in the genus Cyprinus from several lakes in the Yunnan plateau of China.

References

Cyprinus
Fish described in 1963